The Grand Prix International de la ville d'Alger is a stage race held annually in Algeria. It is rated 2.2 and has been part of UCI Africa Tour since 2018.

Winners

References

Cycle races in Algeria
2017 establishments in Algeria
Recurring sporting events established in 2017